WPTQ (105.3 FM) is a radio station licensed to Glasgow, Kentucky, United States, and serving the Bowling Green, Kentucky radio market area. The station is a classic rock-formatted radio station owned by Newberry Broadcasting, Inc. Its radio signal is transmitted from a tower located along Kentucky Route 1297 in rural western Barren County near Railton, with studios located on Campbell Lane in Bowling Green.

History
The station originally signed on the air as WOVO on July 14, 1972. The station was previously a class A station located at 105.5 FM, owned by John Barrick alongside AM station WCDS (1440 AM, unrelated to current WCDS). WOVO inherited a Variety (format)variety format from WCDS, which switched exclusively to country music.

In 1990, WOVO and WCDS were sold to Ward Communications. Several changes came the following year: the station moved to 105.3 FM to obtain a power increase, changed its call sign to WWWQ on March 1, and adopted a new contemporary hit radio format. On September 23, 1996, the station changed its call sign back to WOVO.

On October 22, 2012, WOVO and its adult contemporary format moved to 106.3 FM Horse Cave, KY, while the 105.3 FM frequency became the new home for WPTQ and its classic rock format.

 On October 22, 2012, WPTQ and its mainstream rock format moved from 103.7 FM Cave City, KY to 105.3 FM Glasgow, KY, while the 103.7 FM frequency has picked up the WHHT calls and switched its format to Country, and rebranded the Station as HOWDY 103.7.

On February 16, 2014, WPTQ launched an active rock format on its HD2 sub channel, branded as "98.3 The Edge" (relayed on FM translator W252CV 98.3 FM Bowling Green, Kentucky).

HD digital radio
The station's HD Digital radio signal is multiplexed in the following manner.

HD radio subchannel history
This station began broadcasting on February 17, 2014 as a new active rock station, branded as 98.3 The Edge. The launch of WPTQ-HD2 made WPTQ the first radio station in the Bowling Green radio market to multi-cast their HD radio signal. The subchannel is simulcast over an analog low-powered FM translator W252CV to make the HD radio subchannel available to those who do not own an HD Radio set. The effective radiated power of the translator is limited to 250 watts in order to avoid interference with WQXE in nearby Elizabethtown, Kentucky, which is also run at 98.3 Megahertz.

Since February 2016, the programming of W252CV has also been simulcast at 100.1 Megahertz, on translator W261BD. That translator previously simulcast WKLX's signal. Later that year, the station also began to simulcast over translator W251BT in Glasgow over 98.1 Megahertz.

Programming
WPTQ broadcasts a classic rock music format to the Bowling Green, Kentucky, area. The format features classic rock songs from the 1960s, 1970s and 1980s, as well as select Active Rock songs from the 1990s and 2000s. In addition to its usual music programming, WPTQ broadcasts the games of the National Football League's Tennessee Titans through the Titans Radio Network.  It is also the flagship radio station for WKU Hilltoppers football from the Hilltopper Sports Network.

WPTQ-HD2/W252CV
As an active rock station, the station broadcasts rock hits from the 1980s, 1990s, 2000s, and the current decade, with only the biggest acts in rock and roll from the 1970s. The Local Show, which is now run on this station on Sunday nights at 7 p.m. Central time, is a local show showcasing local rock bands in southern Kentucky.

References

External links

PTQ
Classic rock radio stations in the United States
Glasgow, Kentucky